Dromography (Gr. δρόμος, dromos "way, street, route, corridor" + γράφω, grapho "I write") is the comparative study of organisation, history, geography and logistics of local, regional and global 
trade routes, and other movement, transportation and communication networks. Dromography is one of the auxiliary disciplines of research on world history.

The introduction of this neologism or its definition is attributed to T. Matthew Ciolek. The term is considered a close cousin of "dromograph", which is a device used to record the circulation of blood.

See also
Caravanserai
Cargo
History of transport
Navigation

Further reading
Creveld van, Martin, 1977. Supplying War: Logistics from Wallenstein to Patton. Cambridge: Cambridge University Press.
Engels, Donald W. 1978. Alexander the Great and the Logistics of the Macedonian Army. Berkeley: University of California Press. 
Roth, Jonathan P. 1999. Logistics of the Roman Army at War (264 B.C. - A.D. 235). Leiden/Boston/Köln: Brill.

References

External links
 Ciolek, T. Matthew. 1999–present. Old World Trade Routes (OWTRAD) Project. Canberra: www.ciolek.com - Asia Pacific Research Online.

Economic history studies
Trade routes